Joseph Vincent Malone (4 February 1924 – 24 March 2018) was an Australian rules footballer who played with North Melbourne in the Victorian Football League (VFL).

Prior to playing for North Melbourne, Malone enlisted in the Australian Army and served in New Guinea during World War II.

Notes

External links 

1924 births
2018 deaths
Australian rules footballers from Victoria (Australia)
North Melbourne Football Club players